Break the Bank may refer to:
 Breaking the bank, a gambling term
 Breaking the Bank, a 2014 British comedy film

Game shows
 Break the Bank (1945 game show), 1945 radio show which transitioned to (and sometimes co-existed with) television in 1948
 Break the Bank (1976 game show), hosted by Tom Kennedy and later by Jack Barry
 Break the Bank (1985 game show), hosted by Gene Rayburn and later by Joe Farago
 Kabarkada, Break the Bank, a 2000s Philippine game show

Music
Break the Banks, a 2007 LP from the band Battle
 "Break the Bank" (song), by Schoolboy Q from his album Oxymoron"Break the Bank" song from Golden Era''